Aspatria is a town and civil parish in the Borough of Allerdale in Cumbria, England.  It contains eleven listed buildings that are recorded in the National Heritage List for England.  Of these, one is at Grade II*, the middle grade, and the others are at Grade II, the lowest grade.  The parish contains the town of Aspatria and the surrounding countryside.  Moat of the listed buildings are houses, and the others include a church and associated structures, a footbridge in the railway station, and a memorial and drinking trough.


Key

Buildings

References

Citations

Sources

Lists of listed buildings in Cumbria
Aspatria